Somayeh Mahmoudi is an Iranian politician and current member of the Parliament of Iran. She represents Shahreza and Dehaqan district.

References

1984 births
Living people
Members of the 10th Islamic Consultative Assembly
Members of the Women's fraction of Islamic Consultative Assembly